Vitali Alekseyevich Shitov (born 7 May 2003) is a Russian football player. He plays for FC Zvezda Saint Petersburg on loan from FC Spartak Moscow.

Club career
He made his debut in the Russian Football National League for FC Spartak-2 Moscow on 9 October 2020 in a game against FC Chayka Peschanokopskoye and scored a goal on his debut. His twin brother Vladislav scored twice on his own professional debut for Spartak-2 a month and a half earlier.

He made his debut for the senior squad of FC Spartak Moscow on 15 September 2022 in a Russian Cup game against FC Fakel Voronezh. He made his Russian Premier League debut for Spartak on 23 October 2022 against FC Khimki.

On 17 February 2023, Shitov was loaned to FC Zvezda Saint Petersburg until 11 June 2023.

Personal life
His twin brother Vladislav Shitov is also professional footballer.

Career statistics

References

External links
 Profile by Russian Football National League
 

2003 births
Footballers from Yaroslavl
Living people
Russian footballers
Russia youth international footballers
Association football forwards
FC Spartak-2 Moscow players
FC Spartak Moscow players
Russian First League players
Russian Premier League players